This is a list of fictional dogs in live-action film and is a subsidiary to the list of fictional dogs. It is a collection of various non-animated dogs in film.

Film (live-action)

References

Sources
  Some of the prose in this article was copied from http://www.lingerandlook.com/Names/DogsallList.php and related pages, which are available under the Creative Commons Attribution-Share Alike 3.0 Unported license and the GNU Free Documentation License.

Lists of fictional canines
Fictional dogs